The KhAB-500 is the provisional naming of a series of World War II-era aerial bombs developed by the Soviet Air Force to deliver chemical weapons.

History and Design
KhAB-500s were typically filled with yperite (R-5) or phosgene (R-10).

In ideal weather conditions, the phosgene cloud could produce serious medical effects up to  downwind.

The KhAB-500 was carried by Soviet Union era aircraft.

The bomb was removed from service as a result of the Chemical Weapons Convention in the early 1990s.

See also 
KhAB-250
KAB-500L

References 

Aerial bombs of Russia
Chemical weapons
World War II weapons of the Soviet Union